Martyrs' Day (Chinese:烈士紀念) is celebrated in China on September 30, the eve of the National Day of the People's Republic of China, to commemorate those who lost their lives for the national and territorial integrity of the people of China. It was created by the Standing Committee of the National People's Congress in 2014.

See also

 Nanjing Massacre Memorial Day

References 

September observances
Autumn events in China